Lenka Kenisová-Orságová (born ) is a Czech female weightlifter, competing in the 69 kg category and representing Czech Republic at international competitions. She competed at world championships, including at the 2015 World Weightlifting Championships.

Major results

See also
 2014 World Weightlifting Championships – Women's 69 kg
 2015 World Weightlifting Championships – Women's 69 kg

References

Further reading
 IWF Hungary takes honours at inaugural V4 Cup
 Olympic Weightlifting.nz 

1983 births
Living people
Czech female weightlifters
Place of birth missing (living people)